South Windsor may refer to:

 South Windsor, Connecticut, a town in Connecticut, USA
 South Windsor, New South Wales, a suburb of Sydney, Australia
 South Windsor, Maine, in Kennebec County, USA